"To Holmgard and Beyond" is the first single of the Finnish Viking metal band Turisas. It was released on May 16, 2007 by Century Media in Finland exclusively.

Track listing
 "To Holmgard and Beyond" (edit version)
 "A Portage to the Unknown" 
 "Rex Regi Rebellis" (Finnish version)
 "Battle Metal" Live at Party San '06 (video clip)

Personnel
 Mathias Nygård – vocals, orchestral programming and keyboards
 Jussi Wickström – guitar
 Tude Lehtonen – drums and percussion
 Olli Vänskä – violin
 Hannes Horma – bass
 Lisko – accordion

References 

2007 singles
Turisas songs
2007 songs
Century Media Records singles